"Hold On" is the third track from Badfinger's 1981 album Say No More. Co-written by Tom Evans and Joe Tansin (who had actually left the band prior to the recording of Say No More and was not credited on the original release), the track was their second to last new single (the last being "I Got You", also from Say No More).

Release and reception
"Hold On" was first released in 1981 on Say No More. However, that same year, the song was released as a single in America, (the first from Say No More) backed with the Joey Molland-written song, "Passin' Time". Its follow-up, "I Got You", didn't chart.

AllMusic's Stephen Thomas Erlewine retrospectively described the track as "a shadow of former glories".

References

Badfinger songs
Songs written by Tom Evans (musician)
Song recordings produced by Jack Richardson (record producer)
1981 songs